Jonas Ridge is an unincorporated community in Burke County, North Carolina, United States. Jonas Ridge has a post office with ZIP code 28641.

Notable weather event

During the January 2016 United States blizzard, on January 22, 2016, NBC News reported that as of 5 p.m. (relatively early in the storm), Jonas Ridge had received the greatest amount of snowfall: 18 inches.

Etymology
Traditionally, the name Jonas Ridge has been attributed to Revolutionary War veteran William Barjonah (Jonas) Braswell. Braswell died during a sudden winter storm in 1825. However, an 1809 North Carolina land grant (Book 124, page 408) refers to property on "Jonas Ridge," and a land transaction in the late 1700s refers to Jonas Mountain in the same area. This would indicate that Jonas Ridge was more likely named for John Jonas, who received a land grant nearby in 1780.

References

Unincorporated communities in Burke County, North Carolina
Unincorporated communities in North Carolina